UniCredit Banca S.p.A. was the retail banking division of UniCredit Group. On 1 July 2002, Rolo Banca, Banca CRT, Cariverona Banca, Cassamarca, Cassa di Risparmio di Trento e Rovereto and Cassa di Risparmio di Trieste were merged into Credito Italiano S.p.A. (a new subsidiary of UniCredit incorporated in December 1999), with Credito Italiano was renamed into UniCredit Banca S.p.A.. On 1 January 2003 UniCredit Private Banking and UniCredit Banca d'Impresa were spin off from UniCredit Banca

After UniCredit acquired Capitalia Group in an all-share deal in 2007, UniCredit Group gained the brand Banca di Roma and Banco di Sicilia. UniCredit Banca exchanged branches with the two sister companies (as well as absorbing Bipop Carire), making UniCredit Banca was specialized in the northern Italy. 3 branches of former UniCredit Banca were sold to fellow Italian bank Banca Carige.

In 2010, UniCredit Banca was absorbed by the parent company UniCredit S.p.A., becoming the retail division of the company.

References

External links
 

Banks established in 2002
Italian companies established in 2002
Banks disestablished in 2010
Italian companies disestablished in 2010
Defunct banks of Italy
Companies based in Bologna
Former UniCredit subsidiaries